Troyan (Bulgarian: Троян) is a town in Bulgaria.

Troyan may also refer to:

Places
Troyan Municipality, in Lovech Province, Bulgaria
Troyan (village), in Simeonovgrad municipality, Haskovo Province, Bulgaria
Troyan Peak, in Antarctica
Troyan Pass, a mountain pass in the Balkan Mountains
Troyan Monastery, Bulgaria

People
Troyan (surname)
Troyan Radulov (born 1974), a Bulgarian footballer

See also

Troian (disambiguation)
Trojan (disambiguation)